Brighton Council may refer to:

 Brighton Council (Tasmania) in Australia
 Brighton Borough Council in East Sussex, England, abolished in 1997
 Brighton and Hove City Council in East Sussex, England, formed in 1997
 District Council of Brighton, South Australia, Australia

See also 
 City of Brighton (disambiguation)
 Brighton (disambiguation)